Shahrad Network is an Iranian Internet service provider. The official name of the company is Shahrad Net Company Ltd. This private company has been held in 2006 by providing ADSL and Dialup Internet for home users in Tehran. According to NetIndex Shahrad Net Company Ltd. is the second High-speed ISP in Tehran and 4th in Iran.

Products and services
Shahrad Network provides various services for home and business users:

 ADSL Internet
 Data Center services
 Web hosting service
 Broadband Internet
 Dialup Internet
 Wireless Internet (Limited)

References

Internet service providers of Iran